The 1995 San Francisco Giants season was the Giants' 113th season in Major League Baseball, their 38th season in San Francisco since their move from New York following the 1957 season, and their 36th at Candlestick Park, renamed 3Com Park at Candlestick Point that year. The team finished in fourth place in the National League West with a 67–77 record, 11 games behind the Los Angeles Dodgers.

Offseason
 November 8, 1994: Kent Bottenfield was released by the San Francisco Giants.
 January 2, 1995: Sergio Valdez was signed as a free agent by the Giants.
 February 8, 1995: Darryl Strawberry was released by the Giants.
 April 8, 1995: Terry Mulholland was signed as a free agent by the Giants.
 April 9, 1995: Glenallen Hill was signed as a free agent by the San Francisco Giants.

Regular season

Season standings

Record vs. opponents

Notable transactions
 July 21, 1995: Mark Portugal, Dave Burba and Darren Lewis were traded by the Giants to the Cincinnati Reds for Ricky Pickett, John Roper, Deion Sanders, Scott Service, and David McCarty.

Roster

Player stats

Batting

Starters by position
Note: Pos = Position; G = Games played; AB = At bats; H = Hits; Avg. = Batting average; HR = Home runs; RBI = Runs batted in

Other batters
Note: G = Games played; AB = At bats; H = Hits; Avg. = Batting average; HR = Home runs; RBI = Runs batted in

Pitching

Starting pitchers
Note: G = Games pitched; IP = Innings pitched; W = Wins; L = Losses; ERA = Earned run average; SO = Strikeouts

Other pitchers
Note: G = Games pitched; IP = Innings pitched; W = Wins; L = Losses; ERA = Earned run average; SO = Strikeouts

Relief pitchers
Note: G = Games pitched; W = Wins; L = Losses; SV = Saves; ERA = Earned run average; SO = Strikeouts

Awards and honors
 Mark Carreon 1B, Willie Mac Award
All-Star Game

Farm system 

LEAGUE CHAMPIONS: Shreveport

References

External links
 1995 San Francisco Giants at Baseball Reference
 1995 San Francisco Giants at Baseball Almanac

San Francisco Giants seasons
San Francisco Giants season
San Fran